The Major Seminary in Bruges, in Dutch Grootseminarie, is a centre for training and formation in the Catholic Diocese of Bruges, formerly used as the seminary for preparing candidates for the diocesan priesthood. It is located on the Potterierei in Bruges.

History 
Since 2018, candidates for the priesthood from all Flemish dioceses have been trained at the Johannes XXIII Seminary, Leuven, but the Major Seminary in Bruges continues to provide other educational opportunities, such as the Theologische academie and the School voor geloof. The seminary has a large library and is housed in the 17th-century buildings of the former Ten Duinen Abbey, established in Bruges by Bernard Campmans in 1627. The buildings also house a branch of the United Nations University which works closely with the College of Europe.

Presidents 
The president of the seminary was one of the leading priests of the diocese and usually an honorary canon of the cathedral chapter.

The presidents:
 Louis-Joseph Delebecque (1798-1864) - president 1833-1838
 Livinus Bruneel (1798-1885) - president 1838-1869
 Petrus Dessein (1811) - president 1869-1884
 Henri Delbar (1833-1894) - president 1884-1899
 Henri Vanden Berghe (1848-1932) - president 1899-1907
 Kamiel Callewaert (1866-1943) - president 1907-1934
 Achiel Verhamme (1891-1959) - president 1934-1952
 Maurits De Keyzer (1906-1994) - president 1952-1961
 Joris Van Eeghem (1921-1999) - president 1961-1970
 Paul Declerck (1922-1981) - president 1970-1981
 Adelbert Denaux (born 1938) - president 1981-1992
 Eric Vanden Berghe (1948-2006) - president 1992-2006
 Koen Vanhoutte (born 1957) - president 2006-2016
 Philippe Hallein (born 1972) - president 2016-2018

References

Further reading 
 Adelbert Denaux & Eric Vanden Berghe (eds.), De Duinenabdij en het Grootseminarie te Brugge, Tielt, 1984
 Kurt Priem, Het Grootseminarie te Brugge, de voormalige Duinenabdij, Bruges, 2009

External links 
 Official website

Catholic Church in Belgium
Former Catholic seminaries
Catholic universities and colleges in Belgium
1833 establishments in Belgium
Educational institutions established in 1833